Lloyd Glasspool (born 19 November 1993) is a British professional tennis player who specializes in doubles. He has a career-high doubles ranking of No. 12 (November 2022) and a career-high singles ranking of No. 282 (July 2016). In his career, Glasspool has won three ATP titles, 16 Futures titles (eleven in doubles and five in singles), and in 2021 four ATP Challenger tournaments, in doubles.

Career
Glasspool studied at the University of Texas at Austin, where partnering Søren Hess-Olesen he captured the 2015 NCAA doubles championship.

2016: ATP debut
Glasspool made his ATP Tour debut (in doubles) at the 2016 Wimbledon Championships having been given a wildcard to partner compatriot Dan Evans in the main draw.

2021: First ATP title, Wimbledon third round 
In March 2021, Glasspool won his first ATP Tour title alongside Harri Heliövaara at the 2021 Open 13 against Sander Arends and David Pel of the Netherlands.

2022: Two Major quarterfinals & ATP Finals semifinal, ATP 500 title, top 15
In May 2022, on their debut at the Italian Open, Glasspool and Heliövaara reached their first quarterfinal at a Masters 1000 as alternates, defeating top seeds, world No. 1, Joe Salisbury, and world No. 2, Rajeev Ram, en route in the first round, marking their first win at this level.

At the French Open, he reached a major quarterfinal for the first time in his career with Heliövaara. As a result he moved into the top 50, at world No. 49 on 13 June 2022.
The pair continued with their successful season reaching their first final on grass at the Queen's Club. Next they advanced to the third round at Wimbledon for the second consecutive year. 

They won the biggest title at the ATP 500 European Open defeating Matwe Middelkoop and Rohan Bopanna.
At the 2022 Croatia Open Umag they reached the semifinals defeating wildcard pair Mili Poljicak and Nino Serdarusic. Next they defeated second seeds Rafael Matos and David Vega Hernandez to reach their fifth final of the season.

At the 2022 National Bank Open the pair reached the quarterfinals of a Masters 1000 for the second time in the season where they lost to third seeds Koolhof/Skupski. He reached the top 30 on 22 August 2022 at world No. 28.

Seeded 11th at the US Open they reached their second quarterfinal of a Grand Slam and first at this Major defeating 8th seeded pair of Kyrgios/Kokkinakis in three sets. The pair reached their sixth final of the season at the 2022 Moselle Open. As a result Glasspool reached the top 20 in the doubles rankings on 26 September 2022.

On 4 November the pair qualified for their first 2022 ATP Finals after reaching their first Masters 1000 semifinal at the 2022 Rolex Paris Masters and Glasspool moved into the top 15 in the rankings. They qualified for the ATP finals semifinals defeating Arévalo/Rojer and Granollers/Zeballos both matches in straight sets.

2023: Third title, Tenth final
He won his third title with his partner Heliövaara in Adelaide. He also reached his tenth final in  Dubai with Heliövaara.

Personal life
From 2016 to 2018 Glasspool was in a relationship with fellow tennis professional Heather Watson.

He is the younger brother of former Hollyoaks actor Parry Glasspool.

Doubles performance timeline

Current through the 2023 Indian Wells Masters.

ATP career finals

Doubles: 10 (3 titles, 7 runner-ups)

Challengers and Futures finals

Singles: 11 (5–6)

Doubles: 31 (15–16)

References

External links
 
 

English male tennis players
Sportspeople from Birmingham, West Midlands
Texas Longhorns men's tennis players
British male tennis players
1993 births
Living people
Tennis people from Worcestershire
Sportspeople from Redditch